Ștefan Tarasov (born 8 January 1943) is a Romanian rower. He competed in the men's coxed pair event at the 1968 Summer Olympics.

References

External links
 

1943 births
Living people
People from Sulina
Romanian male rowers
Olympic rowers of Romania
Rowers at the 1968 Summer Olympics